Zuo Guangdou (12 October 1575 – 26 August 1625) was a prominent censorate official in the early 17th century. He detained hundreds of fake officials and confiscated hundreds of fake seals. His main rival was Wei Zhongxian.

Biography
On 12 October 1575, Zuo Guangdou was born in Tongcheng, Anhui. He was named Guangdou because his birthday coincided with the god Doumu's birthdate.

In 1607, he and Yang Lian both became censors for the censorate. After Zuo finished his investigations, seventy fake seals were confiscated while he detained one-hundred fake officials. After the Taichang Emperor died, Wei Zhongxian forced Zuo and Yang to move into the Renshou palace. Tensions grew between the eunuchs and the  Donglin movement faction, whose head was Yang. He was promoted to the Left Minister of the Court of Judicature and Revision in March 1623. In 1624, Zuo Guangdou was promoted to the Left Minister of the Censorate.

Against Wei Zhongxian 
When Wei Zhongxian started to become a dictator in June of  the same year, Yang Lian exposed Wei's twenty-four crimes and said that Wei should be put to death by Lingchi. Zuo Guangdou as well as more than seventy others supported Wei's impeachment. Along with them came another thirty-two crimes that were exposed. However, the Tianqi Emperor dismissed the accusations.

On 25 April 1625, Wei Zhongxian countered with false accusations. He stated that six members of the Donglin faction, including Yang Lian and Zuo Guangdou, had excepted bribes from Xiong Tingbi. The Wei faction tortured Donglin faction's Wang Wenyan into admitting that they had accepted bribes. Wei ruled that Yang Lian and Zuo Guangdou had twenty thousand stolen goods while Wei Dazhong had three thousand. This led to the imprisonment of Yang, Zuo, and four other members of the Donglin faction. They suffered five days of continuous torture. Shi Kefa, a disciple of Zuo, sneaked into the prison to visit his master. He said Zuo "was no longer in human form." Eventually, all six of them died by the tortured, with Zuo dying on 26 August 1625.

Posthumous Honors 
After the death of the Tianqi Emperor, the Chongzhen Emperor posthumously awarded the titles of "Right Minister of the Censorate"() and "Assistant Protector of the Crown Prince". One of his sons was also accepted as an official. The Hongguang Emperor gave Zuo the posthumous title "Duke of Zhongyi".

In Popular Culture
 A General, a Scholar, and a Eunuch is a 2017 Hong Kong science fiction drama show. Zuo Guangdou is played by Raymond Cho and is one of the protagonists. He is the "Scholar."
 Baifa Monü Zhuan is a wuxia novel by Liang Yusheng. Zuo Guangdou is a minor character who is a censorate official who is murdered by Wei Zhongxian's men.

References

Bibliography
Zhang Tingyu (1739). "Volume 244". History of the Ming Dynasty. Qing Dynasty.
"Volume 2". Beilue of the Ming Dunasty.
Zuo Zaizhuan; Ma Qichang. "Volume 1". The Chronicles of Zuo, Duke of Zhongyi. Qing Dynasty.
Fang Bao. Zuo, Duke of Zhongyi's Anecdote.

1575 births
1625 deaths
Ming dynasty politicians
Ancient Chinese censors
People from Tongcheng, Anhui
Chinese torture victims
Donglin partisans